The Women's compound 60m event at the 2010 South American Games was held on March 20 at 11:00.

Medalists

Results

References
Report

60m Compound Women